Pont-à-Marcq is a commune in the Nord department in northern France.

It is the seat of the Communauté de communes Pévèle-Carembault.

Heraldry

See also
Communes of the Nord department

References

External links
Official website

Pontamarcq
Nord communes articles needing translation from French Wikipedia
French Flanders